Lesnoye is a rural locality (a selo) in Nemetsky National District, Altai Krai, Russia. The population was 125 as of 2013.

Geography 
Lesnoye is located 22 km northeast of Galbshtadt (the district's administrative centre) by road. Alexandrovka is the nearest rural locality.

References 

Rural localities in Nemetsky National District